Olivia Apartments is a historic apartment building located at Joplin, Jasper County, Missouri.  It was built in 1906, and is a five-story, "U"-shaped, red brick building.  It measures approximately 100 feet by 125 feet and features Bedford limestone ornamentation and light colored brick cross hatching. 

It was listed on the National Register of Historic Places in 2008. It is located in the Murphysburg Historic District.

References

Individually listed contributing properties to historic districts on the National Register in Missouri
Residential buildings on the National Register of Historic Places in Missouri
Residential buildings completed in 1906
Buildings and structures in Joplin, Missouri
National Register of Historic Places in Jasper County, Missouri
1906 establishments in Missouri